Khudabad may refer to:

Iran
 Khudabad, Fars in Fars, Iran.
 Khudabad, Razavi Khorasan in Khorasan, Iran.

Pakistan
 Khudabad a town in Sindh, Pakistan.
 Khudabad, Gilgit-Baltistan, is a village in Gilgit-Baltistan.